The Oslo-class frigate is a Royal Norwegian Navy frigate design of the 1960s, based on the US Navy  destroyer escorts. The forward hull was customized to suit Norwegian sea conditions better (higher freeboard) and several sub-systems were European built.

Construction 
All ships were built at the Navy Main Yard in Horten, Norway between 1964 and 1966. The construction of the vessels was part of the Navy rebuilding program, approved by the Norwegian government in 1960. Half of the project expenses were funded by the United States as a part of the Mutual Defense Assistance Program (MDAP) (a program that ran from when it was passed by the Congress in October 1949 until 1967–68).

Modernization 
In the late 1970s, the class received new armament, most notably Penguin, RIM-7 Sea Sparrow and Mark 32 torpedo launchers. Another modernization was carried out in the 1980s.

During 1995 and 1996, after HNoMS Oslo experienced an engine failure, and subsequently sank after sailing in heavy weather, the rest of the class was once again modernized. The hulls were strengthened, which in turn increased the displacement with 200 tonnes.

All of the Oslo class are now retired, with HNoMS Narvik preserved as a museum ship. The Oslo class were replaced by the  frigates. This replacement started in mid-2006.

Ships
Five frigates of this class were built. All of them were modernized during the period 1987–1990. They bear the prefix KNM (Kongelig Norske Marine, meaning Royal Norwegian Navy) in Norwegian and HNoMS (His Norwegian Majesty's Ship) in English.

Oslo

The lead ship, Oslo, ran aground near Marstein island on 24 January 1994. One officer was killed in the accident. The next day, on 25 January, she was taken under tow. She sank on the same day in Korsfjorden outside Steinneset in Austevoll county.

Stavanger
Stavanger was decommissioned in 1998. She was later used for target practice and sunk in 2001 by a single DM2A3 torpedo launched from the  Utstein (S 302).

Bergen

Bergen was decommissioned in August 2005, and scrapped in 2013.

Trondheim
On 17 March 2006 at 20:10 CET, Trondheim ran aground off Lines island in Sør-Trøndelag. No injuries among the 121-man crew were reported. The incident was reported from the ship itself, and at 20:30 it came loose again. Water flooded two compartments (paint storage and forward pump room) of the ship. The compartments were sealed and three ships were sent to assist the frigate. The frigate was towed to port in Bergen by the coast guard vessel .

HNoMS Trondheim was used after decommissioning as a target ship. On 5 June 2013, she was severely damaged in a test of the Norwegian-designed Naval Strike Missile system off the coast of the island of Andøya.

Narvik
Narvik, the last active ship of the class, has been transferred to the Royal Norwegian Navy Museum in Horten.

See also 
 
 List of Royal Norwegian Navy ships

References

External links 
 Kysteskadren Fregattvåpenet 
 KNM Narvik 
 Stavanger sunk by Utstein, YouTube video

Cold War frigates of Norway
 
Frigate classes